It's Too Late – We're On! is an Irish television sketch show that aired on RTÉ for one series in 1967. The show, first broadcast on 9 August 1967, featured a large cast, including Des Keogh and Frank Kelly. It is a comedy TV show.

References

1967 Irish television series debuts
1967 Irish television series endings
1960s Irish television series
Irish television sketch shows
RTÉ original programming